30 Days of Night: Dust to Dust is a 2008 American 6-part horror miniseries that was released on FEARnet.com and FEARnet On Demand that acts as a sequel to the 2007 film 30 Days of Night in 2008. Set one month after the events in the film, the series focuses on Sara Maguire, a nurse who is attacked by a vampire and slowly transforms into one. She is tracked down by Nick Maguire, her brother, Gina, an FBI agent, and George Fowler, the vampire hunter from 30 Days of Night: Blood Trails.

Summary 
The show opens with George Fowler (Andrew Laurich), a California Department of Corrections prisoner, shown writing a six letter/digit code on his chest then burning a piece of paper.  When he finishes, an image of a vampire briefly flashes near him.  A prison guard comes to the cell and informs him that he will be moved to maximum security prison.  George goes straight up to the bars and implores him not to take him outside of the prison as the vampires chasing him are waiting for him.  The guard informs him that this is the punishment he gets for beheading people.

The scene changes to Sara and Nick Maguire (Christopher Stapleton) at their apartment.  Nick, a police officer about to resign, is going through some stuff in a box and looks at some newspaper articles detailing murders.  Sara asks Nick what's going on and Nick seems preoccupied.  Sara leaves for work as a nurse at the prison as Nick warns her to be careful.

George is taken outside to be transferred by Sara (Mimi Michaels) and three guards.  A bloodcurdling scream from a vampire is heard in the distance prompting George to try and escape and they ask Sara to inject him to pacify him.  The vampire attacks, slitting Sara's throat thus infecting her with vampirism and killing the guards.  Sara runs off in a panic as George grabs a nearby gun and frees himself from his chains.  He shoots the vampire in the leg and chases after Sara as he realizes she will eventually turn and cause havoc.  Sara gets away from George and cries in an alley.  She feels her teeth growing sharper and is unsure of what is happening to her.

Nick is informed of the incident at the jail and goes on the hunt for George.

George has met up with his drug dealer friend in a trailer to inform him of the situation.  Nick surprises George at gunpoint and tells him to lie down and explain to him what's going on.  The vampire from the jail attack finds them at the trailer and begins stomping on the roof.  The drug dealer goes outside and is killed.  The vampire breaks into the trailer and attacks George and Nick.  They escape and drive off. Nick receives a frantic call from Sara telling him that she's scared and then hangs up.

Meanwhile, Sara is taken in by a woman named Tracy (Rainie Davis).  She is brought into a room and then left alone while Tracy changes in the bathroom.  Sara gets the urge to feed and kills Tracy's dog to quench her voracious thirst.  When Tracy comes out of the bathroom, Sara attacks her, bites into her neck and feeds, killing Tracy.

Nick and George talk as they are driving away from the trailer scene.  George tells Nick about the fact that Sara is no longer his sister.  He tells Nick about how people transform if they are bitten or scratched by these creatures.  He also notes that Sara will likely go to a familiar place when sunrise approaches.  Nick then goes to Tracy's house to find Sara.

Nick and George arrive and find no one.  They see that Tracy is dead on the bed and then they are surprised by Detective Gina Harcourt (Shawnee Smith).  Gina refuses to believe what is going on and thinks that George and Nick killed Tracy.  Tracy springs to life as a vampire and attacks Gina.  Gina pushes Tracy off and George blows her head off with a shotgun blast.  Gina is terrified and agrees to follow George and Nick to find Sara.

George, Nick and Gina go to Nick and Sara's house to wait for her.  Gina goes to take a shower and sees blood draining into the tub.  Sara has been hiding behind her the whole time and lunges forth to feed on her, killing Gina.  George and Nick charge into the bathroom to find a hysterical Sara crying.  Nick decides to handcuff Sara to the top of the shower curtain for her own safety until they figure out what to do with her.  At this point, the vampire chasing George attacks the house with another vampire and they manage to wound George.  The vampire tears the flesh from George's chest holding the six digit number.  Nick kills the main vampire with a stake to the head.  The other vampire tackles Nick and is about to feed on him when Sara breaks herself out of the bathroom and tackles the vampire.  They wrestle for a bit and the vampire attempts to throw Sara outside into the sun.  Sara pushes off at the last second and sends the vampire to its death out on the lawn in the sun.

Sara and Nick talk for a moment and Sara realizes what she needs to do next.  Nick begs her not to go by wrapping his arms around her and pleading with her.  Sara pushes him off and then runs out into the sun, screaming in agony as she dies.

Nick turns around and sees George struggling to his feet.  George's eyes start to turn black, initiating his transformation into a vampire.  Nick takes out his gun and quickly draws it to shoot George dead as the screen blackens out.

Cast 
 Andrew Laurich as George Fowler
 Christopher Stapleton as Detective Nick Maguire
 Shawnee Smith as Detective Gina Harcourt
 Mimi Michaels as Sara Maguire
 Ted Raimi as Frank
 Ken Foree as Nate Keller
 Christopher Nelson as Jacob
 Rainie Davis as Tracy

See also
Vampire film
List of vampire television series

References

External links
 Fear.net Video Page
 

30 Days of Night
2008 web series debuts
2008 web series endings
2000s American television miniseries
American horror fiction television series
Fiction set in 2008
Television series by Sony Pictures Television
Horror fiction web series
American drama web series
Sequel television series
Television shows based on comics
IDW Publishing adaptations
American vampire films
Vampires in television